Ruslan Sharifullin (born 25 August 1985) is a Russian freestyle skier. He competed in the men's moguls event at the 2006 Winter Olympics.

References

External links
 

1985 births
Living people
Russian male freestyle skiers
Olympic freestyle skiers of Russia
Freestyle skiers at the 2006 Winter Olympics
People from Chusovoy
Sportspeople from Perm Krai